General elections were held in Oman on 16 October 1997.

Electoral system
The 82 members of the Consultative Assembly were selected in a two-stage process. Elections were held in 60 constituencies (based on the wilayahs); in 38 constituencies two members were elected, of which Sultan Qaboos chose one to sit in the Assembly, whilst in the remaining 22 constituencies four members were elected, of which the Sultan chose two.

Only around 51,000 people were eligible to vote, with voters chosen by tribal leaders.

Campaign
A total of 736 candidates contested the elections.

Results
The two incumbent female MPs (Shakour bint Mohammed al-Ghamari in Muscat and Taiba al-Mawali in Seeb) were both re-elected.

Members

References

1997 elections in Asia
1997
Election
Non-partisan elections